United Nations Security Council Resolution 361, adopted unanimously on 30 August 1974, after recalling previous resolutions and noting the dire humanitarian conditions in on Cyprus as well as the actions of the UN High Commissioner for Refugees, the Council expressed their appreciation to the Secretary-General Kurt Waldheim for the part he played in bringing about talks between the leaders of the two communities and warmly welcomed this development.

The Council expressed its grave concern for the plight of the refugees and called upon all the parties to do everything in their power to alleviate human suffering and to ensure the respect of fundamental human rights.  The resolution goes on to request the Secretary-General to submit a report on the situation and that he continue to provide emergency UN humanitarian assistance to all populations on the island. The resolution closes by asking all parties, as a demonstration of good faith, to take steps which may promote comprehensive and successful negotiations and reiterated a call for all parties to cooperate fully with the United Nations Peacekeeping Force in Cyprus.

See also
 Cyprus dispute
 List of United Nations Security Council Resolutions 301 to 400 (1971–1976)
 Turkish invasion of Cyprus

References
Text of the Resolution at undocs.org

External links
 

 0361
 0361
Turkish invasion of Cyprus
August 1974 events